Thomas Campbell Fraser (29 October 1917 – 20 May 1998) was a New Zealand cricketer. He played fourteen first-class matches for Otago between 1937 and 1953.

Fraser was born at Dunedin in 1917 and worked as the managing director of a company. Following his death in 1997 obituaries were published in the New Zealand Cricket Annual and, the following year, in Wisden.

References

External links
 

1917 births
1998 deaths
New Zealand cricketers
Otago cricketers
Cricketers from Dunedin